Events in 1982 in animation.

Events

March
 March 24: René Laloux' Les Maîtres du temps premieres.
 March 29: 54th Academy Awards: Crac by Frédéric Back wins the Academy Award for Best Animated Short Film.

April
 April 8: The first episode of Patalliro! is broadcast.

May
 May 14–26 May: 1982 Cannes Film Festival: Pink Floyd: The Wall premieres which features animated sequences by Gerald Scarfe.
 May 27: Rumen Petkov's The Treasure Planet premieres.

June
 June 29: The first episode of The Mysterious Cities of Gold is broadcast.

July
 July 2: Don Bluth's debut film The Secret of NIMH premieres.
 July 15: Japanese animation studio Anime International Company is founded.

August 

 August 5: American animators go on strike to protest runaway productions. Strike ends on October 16.

September
 September 18: The first episode of The Gary Coleman Show is broadcast, an animated series based on popular actor Gary Coleman.
 September 21: Piotr Kamler's Chronopolis premieres.
 September 30: Arlene Klasky and Gábor Csupó co-found the animation studio Klasky Csupo.

October
 October 1: 
 Ralph Bakshi's Hey Good Lookin' premieres.
 Tim Burton's Vincent is first released.
 October 4: The first episode of SuperTed is broadcast.
 October 9: The first episode of Once Upon a Time... Space is broadcast.
 October 21: Martin Rosen's The Plague Dogs premieres.
October 25: The first television special based on Jim Davis's comic strip Garfield, Here Comes Garfield is broadcast.

November
 November 19: The film Heidi's Song is first released, based on the 1881 novel Heidi by Johanna Spyri.

December
 December 24: The first episode of Monica and Friends is broadcast, based on the popular Brazilian comics series Monica's Gang.
 December 26: The Snowman, a Christmas special, is first broadcast, and will become an annually repeated classic.

Specific date unknown
 Eduard Nazarov's Once Upon a Dog is first released.

Films released

 January 16–23 - Miss Switch to the Rescue (United States)
 January 23 - Gauche the Cellist (Japan)
 February 7 - Naniwabushi Daisuki (Japan)
 February 17 - I Am a Cat (Japan)
 March 13:
 Aladdin and the Magic Lamp (Japan)
 Doraemon: Nobita and the Haunts of Evil (Japan)
 Kaibutsu-kun: Demon no Ken (Japan)
 Mobile Suit Gundam III: Encounters in Space (Japan)
 Ohayō! Spank (Japan)
 Queen Millennia (Japan)
 March 20 - Zō no Inai Dōbutsuen (Japan)
 March 24 - Les Maîtres du temps (France, Switzerland, West Germany, United Kingdom, and Hungary)
 March 31 - Urusei Yatsura: Haru da, Tobidase! (Japan)
 April 1 - Adventures of Robinson Crusoe, a Sailor from York (Czechoslovakia)
 April 6 - The Flying Windmill (East Germany)
 April 24: 
 Haguregumo (Japan)
 Sengoku Majin GōShōgun (Japan)
 April 29 - Dr. Poppen and the Swamp of No Return (Japan)
 May - Chronopolis (France and Poland)
 May 5: 
 Hokseongnoboteu Sseondeo A (South Korea)
 Shiroi Kiba White Fang Monogatari (Japan)
 Two Down Full Base (Japan)
 May 24 - A Charlie Brown Celebration (United States)
 May 27 - The Treasure Planet (Bulgaria)
 June 17 -  Son Gokuu Silk Road wo Tobu!! (Japan)
 July 1 - The Wizard of Oz (Japan)
 July 2 - The Secret of NIMH (United States)
 July 3 - Space Adventure Cobra: The Movie (Japan)
 July 9 - Tron (United States)
 July 10: 
 Dr. Slump: "Hoyoyo!" Space Adventure (Japan)
 The Ideon: A Contact (Japan)
 The Ideon: Be Invoked (Japan)
 July 28 - Space Pirate Captain Harlock: Arcadia of My Youth (Japan)
 July 15 - Pink Floyd – The Wall (United Kingdom)
 August 1 - Super Taekwon V (South Korea)
 August 3 - Shalom Pharao (West Germany)
 August 7 - Techno Police 21C (Japan)
 August 17 - The Flight of Dragons (United States and Japan)
 August 18 - Syupeo samchongsa (South Korea)
 August 21: 
 Flash Gordon: The Greatest Adventure of All (United States)
 Star of the Giants (Japan)
 August 22: 
 Adrift in the Pacific (Japan)
 Andromeda Stories (Japan)
 September 30 - Schooltime Blues (Hungary)
 October 1 - Hey Good Lookin' (United States)
 October 6 - Shōnen Miyamoto Musashi – Wanpaku Nitō-ryū (Japan)
 October 9 - Pro Golfer Saru (Japan)
 October 21 - The Plague Dogs (United Kingdom and United States)
 October 24 - Tsushima Maru: Sayonara Okinawa (Japan)
 October 30 - Future War 198X (Japan)
 November 19: 
 Bugs Bunny's 3rd Movie: 1001 Rabbit Tales (United States)
 Heidi's Song (United States)
 The Last Unicorn (United States, United Kingdom, and Japan)
 December 3:
 Attack of the Super Monsters (Japan)
 Mafalda (Argentina)
 December 10 - Mighty Mouse in the Great Space Chase (United States)
 December 15 - Oliver Twist (Australia)
 December 18:
 God Mars: The Movie (Japan)
 Syupeo Majingga 3 (South Korea)
 December 21 - Heungnyongwanggwa Bihodongja (South Korea)
 December 22 - A Christmas Carol (Australia)
 December 23 - The Adventures of Monica and Her Friends (Brazil)
 December 24 - Ai no Kiseki: Doctor Norman Monogatari (Japan)
 Specific date unknown:
 Autumn (Soviet Union)
 Haedori daemoheom (South Korea)
 Old Master Q: Water Tiger Tale (Hong Kong)
 Sarah (Australia)

Television series 

 January 4 - Sankokushi debuts in syndication.
 January 10 - Lucy of the Southern Rainbow debuts on TV Tokyo.
 January 25 - Asari-chan debuts on TV Asahi.
 February 6 - Combat Mecha Xabungle debuts on ANN, Nagoya TV, and TV Asahi.
 February 7 - Naniwabushi Daisuki debuts in syndication.
 February 13 - Gyakuten! Ippatsuman debuts on Fuji TV.
 March 3 - Kikou Kantai Dairugger XV debuts on MegaTON (TV Tokyo).
 March 18 - Magical Princess Minky Momo debuts on TV Tokyo.
 April 5: 
 Don Dracula and The Flying House debut on TV Tokyo.
 Game Center Arashi debuts on NTV.
 April 8 - Patalliro! debuts on Fuji TV.
 April 17 - Thunderbirds 2086 debuts on Fuji TV.
 May 1 - The Mysterious Cities of Gold debuts on NHK General TV and Antenne 2.
 May 5: 
 Acrobunch debuts on Nippon Television.
 Anime Yasei No Sakebi debuts on Tokyo 12.
 May 8 - Little Pollon debuts on Fuji TV and Italia 1.
 June 5 - Tonde Mon Pe debuts in syndication.
 July 5 - The Kabocha Wine debuts on TV Asahi.
 July 6 - Baxinger debuts on TV Tokyo.
 September 18: 
 Gilligan's Planet, Meatballs & Spaghetti, and Pandamonium debut on CBS.
 Shirt Tales, The Flintstone Funnies, The Gary Coleman Show, and The Incredible Hulk debut on NBC.
 The Little Rascals debuts on ABC.
 September 25: Mork & Mindy/Laverne & Shirley/Fonz Hour, Laverne & Shirley with the Fonz, Pac-Man, Scrappy and Yabba-Doo, The Pac-Man/Little Rascals/Richie Rich Show, The Puppy's Further Adventures, and The Scooby & Scrappy-Doo/Puppy Hour debut on ABC.
 October 2 - Once Upon a Time... Space debuts on FR3 and Fuji TV.
 October 3 - The Super Dimension Fortress Macross debuts on MBS.
 October 4 - Ninjaman Ippei debuts in syndication.
 October 7: 
 Robby the Rascal debuts on TV Tokyo.
 Space Cobra debuts on Fuji TV.
 Tokimeki Tonight debuts on Nippon Television.
 October 10 - Warrior of Love Rainbowman debuts on TBS.
 October 12 - Maya the Honey Bee debuts on TV Osaka and TV Tokyo.
 October 13 - Arcadia of My Youth: Endless Orbit SSX debuts on TBS.
 October 17 - Sasuga No Sarutobi debuts in syndication.
 November 1 - SuperTed debuts on S4C.
 November 2 - Fuku-Chan: Yokoyama Ryuichi No Kessaku Anime debuts on TV Asahi.
 November 13 - Murun Buchstansangur debuts on Channel 4.
 Specific date unknown:
 Hitotsuboshi-Ke No Ultra BaâSan debuts in syndication.
 Pimpa debuts on Rai 1 and Rai 2.

Births

January
 January 10:
 Josh Ryan Evans, American actor (voice of Third Grader in the Hey Arnold! episode "Big Gino", Small Boy and Lottsatot #2 in the Rugrats episode "No Place Like Home"), (d. 2002).
 Misato Fukuen, Japanese actress (voice of Sailor Chibi-Moon in Sailor Moon Crystal, Elicia Hughes in Fullmetal Alchemist: Brotherhood, Eve in Black Cat, Himiko Toga in My Hero Academia, Miyuki Hoshizora / Cure Happy in Smile PreCure!).
 January 13: Dayci Brookshire, American actress (voice of Jessica and Dressy in The Epic Tales of Captain Underpants, Apple in Home: Adventures with Tip & Oh, young Zatanna in the Justice League Action episode "Trick or Threat").
 January 20: Sara Gunnarsdottir, Icelandic director, animator and artist (The Diary of a Teenage Girl, My Year of Dicks).
 January 24: Daveed Diggs, American actor and musician (voice of Norath Kev in Star Wars Resistance, Helen in Central Park, Command Tysess in Star Trek: Prodigy, Cyborg in DC League of Super-Pets).

February
 February 1: Jarrett Lennon, American former child actor (voice of Kenny Fowler in 2 Stupid Dogs, Eugene Horowitz in season 1 of Hey Arnold!, young Ed Grimley in The Completely Mental Misadventures of Ed Grimley episode "The Irving Who Came to Dinner").
 February 2: Nick Cofrancesco, American production coordinator (Nickelodeon Animation Studio, Family Guy, Curious George), television writer (The Mighty B!) and producer (Mattel Television).
 February 7: Cory Doran, Canadian voice actor and director (voice of Jimmy in Jimmy Two-Shoes, Andrew Baumer in Stoked, Mike in the Total Drama franchise, Dabio in Wild Kratts, George in George of the Jungle, Noah in Total DramaRama, Cranky in Thomas & Friends).
 February 8: Danny Tamberelli, American actor, comedian, and musician (voice of Arnold Perlstein in The Magic School Bus, Joseph Anza in Fillmore!).
 February 16: Chris Jai Alex, American actor (voice of Panthro in ThunderCats Roar, Esidisi in JoJo's Bizarre Adventure, Pedro in A Silent Voice, Lord Boros in One-Punch Man, Nickes and Bopobo in Hunter x Hunter, Orga Sabnak in Mobile Suit Gundam SEED, additional voices in Steven Universe).

March
 March 10: Thomas Middleditch, Canadian actor, comedian and screenwriter (voice of the title character in Penn Zero: Part-Time Hero, Harold Hutchins in Captain Underpants: The First Epic Movie, Lester in Henchmen, Alex in Bob's Burgers, Donny Tinselton and Bash in Big City Greens, Garnoz in Phineas and Ferb the Movie: Candace Against the Universe, Terry in Solar Opposites, Professor Fartsparkles in the Bravest Warriors episode "Time Slime", Tommy Lipnip in the Rick and Morty episode "The ABC's of Beth", Warlock and Caller in the TripTank episode "TripTank 2025", Simon in the Animals episode "Rats.").
 March 11: Robbie Daymond, American voice actor (voice of Tuxedo Mask in the Viz Media dub of Sailor Moon, Peter Parker/Spider-Man in Marvel Disk Wars: The Avengers, Avengers Assemble and Spider-Man, Jesse Cosay in Infinity Train, Raymond in OK K.O.! Let's Be Heroes, Eighth Brother in the Star Wars Rebels episode "Twilight of the Apprentice").
 March 20: Erica Luttrell, Canadian actress (voice of Keesha Franklin in The Magic School Bus, Candy in Dave the Barbarian, Sapphire in the Steven Universe franchise, young Doctor Fate in the Justice League Action episode "Trick or Threat").
 March 21: Santino Fontana, American actor and singer (voice of Hans in Frozen, Petru in the Vampirina episode "Phantom of the Auditorium").
 March 22: Constance Wu, American actress (vice of Daphne Blake in Velma, the Mayor of Ninjago in The Lego Ninjago Movie, Molly in Next Gen, Mom in Wish Dragon).
 March 25: Jenny Slate, American actress and comedienne (voice of Dawn Bellwether in Zootopia, Princess Pony Head in Star vs. the Forces of Evil, Gidget in The Secret Life of Pets and The Secret Life of Pets 2, Miss Nanny in Muppet Babies, Tammy Larsen in Bob's Burgers, Harley Quinn in The Lego Batman Movie).
 March 28: Flula Borg, German actor and musician (voice of Mega Fat CEO Baby in The Boss Baby: Back in Business, Dickory in Trolls World Tour, Robotman in Teen Titans Go!, Alfons in Rapunzel's Tangled Adventure, Ziegler in the Archer episode "Danger Island: A Warrior in Costume").

April
 April 1: Taran Killam, American actor, comedian and writer (portrayed Jim McNaughton in Teenage Mutant Ninja Turtles, voice of Skip in Underdogs, Frantic in The Awesomes, the title character in Nature Cat, John Kimble, Indiana Jones and Tyler Durden in the Robot Chicken episode "Ext. Forest Day", Charles Willoughby-Wentworth in the We Bare Bears episode "Adopted", Glen Tangier in The Simpsons episode "Bart the Bad Guy", Ichabod in the Vampirina episode "A Tale of Two Hollows").
 April 3: Cobie Smulders, Canadian actress (voice of Wonder Woman in The Lego Movie and The Lego Movie 2: The Second Part, Nature Dog in Nature Cat, Anni in the Animals episode "Flies.", Hydrangea in The Simpsons episode "Bart the Bad Guy", Maria Hill in the What If...? episode "What If... Thor Were an Only Child?").
 April 15: Seth Rogen, Canadian actor (voice of Mantis in the Kung Fu Panda franchise, B.O.B. in Monsters vs. Aliens, the title character in Paul, Pumbaa in The Lion King, Frank in Sausage Party, Bob in Chip 'n Dale Rescue Rangers, Donkey Kong in The Super Mario Bros. Movie).
April 19: 
 Cassandra Lee Morris, American voice actress (voice of Kyubey in Puella Magi Madoka Magica, Saki Mikajima in Durarara!!, Leafa in Sword Art Online, Calaveras and Cere-Cere in the Viz Media dub of Sailor Moon, Rachel Larsen / Glitter Diamond in Glitter Force Doki Doki, Kiazuki in Hanazuki: Full of Treasures, Sabrina Raincomprix and Pollen in Miraculous: Tales of Ladybug & Cat Noir, Liv Baker / Myst in Ghostforce, Leif in Amphibia).
 Ali Wong, American actress and comedian (voice of Bertie in Tuca & Bertie, Ali in Big Mouth, Becca in Human Resources, Betty in The Angry Birds Movie, Olivia in The Lego Ninjago Movie, Felony in Ralph Breaks the Internet, Citrus Twisty in the OK K.O.! Let's Be Heroes episode "Soda Genie", Maddy in the BoJack Horseman episode "Escape from L.A.", Dana in the Animals episode "Rats.").
 April 24: Kelly Clarkson, American singer, songwriter, author and television personality (voice of Leah in The Star, Moxy in UglyDolls, Delta Dawn in Trolls World Tour, herself in the King of the Hill episode "Stressed for Success" and the Phineas and Ferb episode "A Phineas and Ferb Family Christmas").
 April 28: Harry Shum Jr., Costa Rican actor (voice of Brainiac 5 in Legion of Super-Heroes, Rawda in the Star Trek: Lower Decks episode "A Mathematically Perfect Redemption").

May
 May 11: Cory Monteith, Canadian actor and musician (voice of Finn Hudson in The Cleveland Show episode "How Do You Solve a Problem Like Roberta?", voiced himself in The Simpsons episode "Elementary School Musical"), (d. 2013).
 May 15: Tatsuya Fujiwara, Japanese actor (voice of Light Yagami in Death Note, Japanese dub voice of Kuzco in The Emperor's New Groove).
 May 16: Melissa Altro, Canadian actress (voice of Muffy Crosswire in Arthur, Gretchen in Camp Lakebottom, Sally in Dex Hamilton: Alien Entomologist, Paige Logan in Grossology, the title character in Pippi Longstocking).
 May 20: Donald Reignoux, French actor (French dub voice of Carl Wheezer in The Adventures of Jimmy Neutron, Boy Genius, Kevin Levin in the Ben 10 franchise, the title character in Danny Phantom, Louie in Quack Pack and DuckTales, Phineas Flynn in Phineas and Ferb, Kristoff in the Frozen franchise, Numbuh 4 in Codename: Kids Next Door, Brainiac 5 in Legion of Super Heroes, T.J. Detweiler in Recess, Robin in Young Justice, Once-ler in The Lorax, Tai Kamiya in the Digimon franchise, Shinji Ikari in Neon Genesis Evangelion).
 May 25:
Esmé Bianco, English actress and neo-burlesque performer (voice of Queen Eclipsa in Star vs. the Forces of Evil).
Fryda Wolff, American voice actress (voice of Jade in Bratz, Faora in Justice League Action, Enchantress in Avengers Assemble, Dahlia in Kipo and the Age of Wonderbeasts, the Collector in The Owl House, DJ Suki in Trolls: The Beat Goes On!).

June
 June 19: Michael Yarmush, American-Canadian actor (original voice of the title character in Arthur).
 June 29:
 Matthew Mercer, American actor (voice of Jotaro Kujo in JoJo's Bizarre Adventure: Stardust Crusaders, Leorio Paladiknight in Hunter x Hunter, Levi in Attack on Titan, Prince Dimande in Sailor Moon, Iron Man in Marvel Disk Wars: The Avengers, Trafalgar Law in One Piece, Ivan Bruel in season 1 of Miraculous: Tales of Ladybug & Cat Noir, Rhino in Spider-Man, Tygra in ThunderCats, Cokey Brian in Close Enough).
 Colin Jost, American actor, comedian (portrayed Ben in Tom & Jerry) and television writer (Kappa Mikey).
 June 30: Lizzy Caplan, American actress (voice of Reagan Ridley in Inside Job).

July
 July 8:
Pendleton Ward, American animator, writer, and voice actor (creator of Adventure Time and Bravest Warriors, and voice of Lumpy Space Princess and Abraham Lincoln in the former show).
Sophia Bush, American actress (voice of Voyd in Incredibles 2, Sara in the Phineas and Ferb episode "Phineas and Ferb Get Busted!").
 July 24: Elisabeth Moss, American actress (voice of Holly in Frosty Returns, Katrina in Animaniacs, Arisia Rrab in Green Lantern: Emerald Knights, Michelle in Once Upon a Forest, Kimmy Ventrix in the Batman: The Animated Series episode "See No Evil", Kathy in the Freakazoid! episode "Candle Jack", Gretchen in The Simpsons episode "Labor Pains").

August
 August 16: Todd Haberkorn, American actor (voice of Natsu Dragneel in Fairy Tail, Italy in Hetalia: Axis Powers, Hikaru Hitachiin in Ouran High School Host Club, Allen Walker in D.Gray-man, Death the Kid in Soul Eater, Tsukune Aono in Rosario + Vampire, Kimihiro Watanuki in xxxHolic, Yamato Akitsuki in Suzuka, Galileo in Power Players, Xavier Ramier in Miraculous: Tales of Ladybug & Cat Noir, Tetrax, Solar Twain, Grey Matter, and Slapback in Ben 10).
 August 19: Melissa Fumero, American actress (voice of Antonia in Elena of Avalor, Starla in the She-Ra and the Princesses of Power episode "Stranded", Cantaloupe Sinclair in the Big City Greens episode "Dolled Up", Melissa Tarleton in M.O.D.O.K.).
 August 22: Aparna Nancherla, American actress and comedienne (voice of Hollyhock in BoJack Horseman, Nephrite in the Steven Universe episode "Legs From Here to Homeworld").
 August 25: Benjamin Diskin, American voice actor (voice of Junior in Problem Child, Numbuh 1 and Numbuh 2 in Codename: Kids Next Door, Kai Miyagusuku in Blood+, Venom in The Spectacular Spider-Man, Flash Thompson in Spider-Man, the title character in Stitch!, Gurio Umino in the Viz Media dub of Sailor Moon, Gonzo and Rizzo in Muppet Babies, Skeletor in He-Man and the Masters of the Universe, Skaar in Ultimate Spider-Man and Hulk and the Agents of S.M.A.S.H., Spider-Ham and Morbius in Ultimate Spider-Man, Nino Lahiffe, Max Kanté, Nooroo, Sass, and Butler Jean in Miraculous: Tales of Ladybug & Cat Noir).
 August 26: John Mulaney, American comedian, actor, writer, and producer (voice of Peter Porker/Spider-Ham in Spider-Man: Into the Spider-Verse, Chip in Chip 'n' Dale: Rescue Rangers, Jack Horner in Puss in Boots: The Last Wish, Andrew Glouberman in Big Mouth and Human Resources, Warburton Parker in The Simpsons, Olafur and Mackerel in the Animals episode "Pigeons").
 August 30: Bill Chernega, American film editor (Eon Kid, Wow! Wow! Wubbzy!, Dante's Inferno: An Animated Epic, Sesame Street), software developer (Dead Space: Downfall, Dan Vs.) and production assistant (Turok: Son of Stone).
 August 31: Raven Molisee, American animator, storyboard artist (Ed, Edd n Eddy, WildBrain Studios, Steven Universe, The Hollow, Rainbow Butterfly Unicorn Kitty, The Wonderful World of Mickey Mouse) and writer (Steven Universe).

September
 September 1: Michael Adamthwaite, Canadian voice actor (voice of Jay in Ninjago, Sergeant Night in Mega Man: Fully Charged, Zenblock in Supernoobs, Colossus in X-Men: Evolution, Justin Hammer in Iron Man: Armored Adventures).
 September 10: Bret Iwan, American actor (fourth official voice of Mickey Mouse).
 September 13: J.G. Quintel, American animator, storyboard artist (Cartoon Network Studios, Phineas and Ferb), writer, director and producer (creator and voice of Mordecai and Hi-Five Ghost in Regular Show, Josh in Close Enough).
 September 15: Evan Goldberg, Canadian actor (voice of Craig, Crowd and A-Team Men in Santa Inc.), screenwriter (The Simpsons, Sausage Party, The Boys Presents: Diabolical), director and producer (Sausage Party, Santa Inc., Invincible, The Boys Presents: Diabolical).
 September 22: Katie Lowes, American actress (voice of Candlehead in Wreck-It Ralph and Ralph Breaks the Internet, Abigail Callaghan in Big Hero 6, Commander Ladnok in Voltron: Legendary Defender, Becky in Vivo).
 September 30: Lacey Chabert, American actress (voice of Eliza Thornberry in The Wild Thornberrys, Meg Griffin in season 1 of Family Guy, Gwen Stacy in The Spectacular Spider-Man, Zatanna in Young Justice and Justice League Action, Vitani in The Lion King II: Simba's Pride and The Lion Guard, Tanya in An American Tail: The Treasure of Manhattan Island and An American Tail: The Mystery of the Night Monster, singing voice of young Anastasia in Anastasia).

October
 October 3: Erik von Detten, American actor (voice of Sid in the Toy Story franchise, Erwin Lawson in Recess, Flynt in Tarzan and The Legend of Tarzan, Vic in the Aaahh!!! Real Monsters episode "The Switching Hour", Shovin' Buddy in the Family Guy episode "Peter's Progress", Chan in the Avatar: The Last Airbender episode "The Beach").
 October 10: Dan Stevens, English actor (voice of Admiral Hornagold in The Sea Beast, Scarlemagne in Kipo and the Age of Wonderbeasts, Charles and Phillip in The Prince).
 October 15: Toran Caudell, American actor and musician (voice of Arnold in season 1 of in Hey Arnold!, Tripod in 101 Dalmatians: The Series, King Bob in Recess, Fred in As Told by Ginger, Newsboy and Kid in the Aaahh!!! Real Monsters episode "The Great Escape", Cool Kid in the Rocket Power episode "Home Sweet Home", TJ and Slacker Kid in the All Grown Up! episode "Tweenage Tycoons").
 October 19: Gillian Jacobs, American actress (voice of Samantha in Invincible, Dakota in Ten Year Old Tom, Rosalind and Katherine in Long Live the Royals, Sta'abi in Monsters vs. Aliens, Roxy Rocket in the Justice League Action episode "The Fatal Fare").
 October 23: Bradley Pierce, American actor and producer (voice of Chip in Beauty and the Beast, Nibs in Return to Never Land, Flounder in The Little Mermaid, Tails in Sonic the Hedgehog).

November 
 November 1: Michaela Dietz, American actress (voice of Amethyst in the Steven Universe franchise, Vee in The Owl House, Daryll McGee in The Ghost and Molly McGee, Blue Behemoth in Kid Cosmic, Danelda in Mighty Magiswords).
 November 12: Anne Hathaway, American actress (voice of Hau Yoshioka in The Cat Returns, Red in Hoodwinked!, Jewel in Rio and Rio 2, Jenny in The Simpsons, herself in the Family Guy episode "April in Quahog").
 November 18: Damon Wayans Jr., American actor and comedian (voice of Wasabi in Big Hero 6).
 November 28: Adam McArthur, American actor (voice of Marco Diaz in Star vs. the Forces of Evil, Chad in The Adventures of Puss in Boots, Lee-Char in Star Wars: The Clone Wars, Yuji Itadori in Jujutsu Kaisen, Koku Hanabata / Trumpet in My Hero Academia).
 November 29: Gemma Chan, English actress (voice of Namaari in Raya and the Last Dragon, Kurma in Hotel Transylvania: The Series, Dewdrop in Watership Down, Professor Kwark in the Thunderbirds are Go episode "Icarus").

December 
 December 8: Nicki Minaj, Trinidadian musician and actress (voice of Sugilite in Steven Universe, Steffie in Ice Age: Continental Drift, Pinky in The Angry Birds Movie 2).
 December 24: Robert Schwartzman, American musician and member of Rooney (performed the theme song of Iron Man: Armored Adventures).
 December 29: Alison Brie, American actress (voice of Unikitty in The Lego Movie franchise, Diane Nguyen in BoJack Horseman, Natsumi Suga in Weathering with You, Aftershock in Moon Girl and Devil Dinosaur, Planetina in the Rick and Morty episode "A Rickconvenient Mort").
 December 30: MeatCanyon, American YouTuber, animator, voice actor, comedian, writer and director.

Deaths

January
 January 5: Hans Conried, American actor (voice of George Darling and Captain Hook in Peter Pan, Snidely Whiplash in Dudley Do-Right, Wally Walrus in Woody Woodpecker), dies at age 64.
 January 11: Paul Lynde, American comedian and voice actor (voice of Templeton in Charlotte's Web, Mildew Wolf in Cattanooga Cats, Claude Pertwee in Where's Huddles?, Sylvester Sneekly/The Hooded Claw in The Perils of Penelope Pitstop), dies at age 55.

February
 February 12: Victor Jory, Canadian-American actor (narrator in Tubby the Tuba), dies at age 79.

March
 March 12: Ken Harris, American animator and film director (Warner Bros. Cartoons, DePatie-Freleng, Hanna-Barbera, Chuck Jones), dies at age 83.

April
 April 8: James Whitney, American film director (Five Film Exercises, Lapis, Yantra), dies at age 60.
 April 25: Don Wilson, American announcer and actor (narrator in Ferdinand the Bull, voiced himself in The Mouse that Jack Built), dies at age 81.

June
 June 11: Al Rinker, American musician (The Aristocats), dies at age 74.
 June 14: Marjorie Bennett, Australian actress (voice of Duchess in 101 Dalmatians), dies at age 86.

July
 July 2: Jack Bogle, American animator and comics artist (Pat Sullivan (Felix the Cat), Van Beuren Studios, Walt Disney Company), dies at age 81.
 July 6: Warren Tufts, American comics artist, animator and voice actor (Cambria Studios, Hanna-Barbera) dies at age 56 in an airplane crash.

August
 August 9: Alexandre Alexeieff, Russian animator, film director (The Nose, Pictures at an Exhibition), inventor (pinscreen) and producer, dies at age 81.
 August 13: Joe E. Ross, American actor (voice of Oxx in The Adventures of Robin Hoodnik, Botch in Help!... It's the Hair Bear Bunch!, Sergeant Flint in Hong Kong Phooey, Officer Gunther Toody in Wait Till Your Father Gets Home, Roll in CB Bears, Daniel in No Man's Valley), dies at age 68.
 August 17: Barney Phillips, American actor (voice of the title character in Shazzan!, Porthos in The Three Musketeers, King Neptune in The Popeye Valentine's Day Special - Sweethearts at Sea, Pere David in No Man's Valley), dies at age 68.

November
 November 25: Hugh Harman, American animator (co-founder of Warner Bros. and Metro-Goldwyn-Mayer's animation studios), dies at age 79.

Specific date unknown
 Dan Noonan, American animator and comics artist (Terrytoons, Walt Disney Company, Filmation, Hanna-Barbera), dies at age 71.

See also
 1982 in anime

References

External links
Animated works of the year, listed in the IMDb

 
1980s in animation